José Luis Fernández Sixto, more commonly known as Lucho Fernández (born 8 February 1975) is a Spanish retired professional basketball player who last played for Marín Peixegalego.

Honours
 2007–08 ACB League Champion with Tau Cerámica

References

External links
Profile at Euroleague
Profile at Liga ACB
Profile at Spanish Basketball Federation

1975 births
Living people
Baloncesto León players
Bilbao Basket players
CB Breogán players
Liga ACB players
Saski Baskonia players
Spanish men's basketball players
Club Ourense Baloncesto players
UB La Palma players
Gipuzkoa Basket players
Power forwards (basketball)